Peter Furstenburg (born 16 February 1987) is a South African cricketer. He played in eight first-class, eight List A, and seven Twenty20 matches from 2006 to 2013.

References

External links
 

1987 births
Living people
South African cricketers
Eastern Province cricketers
North West cricketers
Cricketers from Port Elizabeth